Okere-Urhobo is the name of one of the two Urhobo kingdoms in  Warri South Local Government, Delta State, Nigeria, the other being Agbassa.

History 
Okere-Urhobo is one of two district Urhobo social groupings found in what is known as Warri township. Its first settlement is near the Okere River bounded by the Itsekiri, the Urhobo of Uvwie and the Urhobo of Agbarha-Ame.

References 

Ethnic groups in Nigeria